Yang Kun-pi (born August 11, 1998) is a Taiwanese sport shooter. He placed 25th in the men's trap event at the 2016 Summer Olympics.

References

External links

1998 births
Living people
Trap and double trap shooters
Taiwanese male sport shooters
Olympic shooters of Taiwan
Shooters at the 2016 Summer Olympics
Shooters at the 2018 Asian Games
Asian Games medalists in shooting
Asian Games gold medalists for Chinese Taipei
Asian Games silver medalists for Chinese Taipei
Medalists at the 2018 Asian Games
Universiade gold medalists for Chinese Taipei
Universiade silver medalists for Chinese Taipei
Universiade medalists in shooting
Medalists at the 2019 Summer Universiade
Shooters at the 2020 Summer Olympics
21st-century Taiwanese people